Giroussens is a commune in the department of Tarn in southern France. It is particularly famous for its market of European pottery that attracts many tourists in the spring.

Geography
The commune is traversed by the river Dadou.

Notable personalities 

 Lucie Bouniol (1896-1988), sculptor, painter, born at the castle of Belbèze.

Points of interest
Jardins des Martels

See also
Communes of the Tarn department

References

Communes of Tarn (department)